Live in London is a live album by the Brand New Heavies released in October 2009.

Track listing

CD 1
"Intro" (This track later became the title track of their next studio album released in 2013, Forward)
"People Get Ready"
"BNH"
"All Fired Up"  (S. Bartholomew/J. Kincaid/A. Levy) 
"Never Stop"
"Dream On Dreamer"  (N. Davenport/D. Austin) 
"Midnight at the Oasis"  (D. Nichtern) 
"Sometimes"
"Back to Love"
"Sex God"  (S. Bartholomew/N. Davenport/A. Levy) 
"I Don't Know Why (I Love You)"  (S. Wonder) 
"Ride in the Sky"
"Day Break"

CD 2
"Brother Sister"
"Jump and Move"
"Let's Do It Again" (S. Bartholomew/N. Davenport/J. Kincaid/A. Levy) 
"Spend Some Time"  (A. Levy/A. Cheung) 
"You Are the Universe"
"Forever"
"Stay This Way"
"Dream Come True"

Personnel

The Brand New Heavies
Jan Kincaid – vocals & drums
N'Dea Davenport – vocals
Simon Bartholomew – guitar & background vocals
Andrew Love Levy – bass guitar & background vocals
Hazel Fernandes – background vocals

Musicians
Finn Peters – saxophone
Dominic Glover – trumpet
Nichol Thomson – trombone
Matt Steele – keyboards
Lascelles Gordon – percussion
Matt Kemp – audio mixer
Paul Nickson – audio mixer
Will Shapland – audio mixer
The Brand New Heavies – editor
Andrew Love Levy – photographer
The Brand New Heavies – additional photography
Will Shapland – unknown contributor role

Recording information: The Indigo2, London (10/16/2008).

The Brand New Heavies albums
2009 live albums
Delicious Vinyl live albums